Peter Mikkelsen (born 9 August 1982) is a Danish badminton player. Mikkelsen was a part of the Horsens club and also trained in Aarhus. In 2009, he reach the final round at the national championships for the first time. He reaching the final round after beat Joachim Persson and Jan Ø. Jørgensen, but he lost to Peter Gade in the rubber game. In 2006, he won the international tournament in Cyprus. The following year in 2007 he was victorious at the Portugal International, Spanish Open and Irish International. He conquered the Croatian International title in 2009 along with the Finnish International.
In Denmark Peter Mikkelsen won many single matches on Vendsyssel's league team giving him a cult status bearing the nickname "mayor" in Northern Jutland. He now is the head coach/trainer at the Horsens Badminton Klub (HBK) in Denmark.

Achievements

BWF International Challenge/Series
Men's singles

 BWF International Challenge tournament
 BWF International Series tournament

References

External links
 
 Translated interview at www.badmintoncentral.com

Living people
1982 births
Danish male badminton players